Törőcsik is a Hungarian surname. Notable people with the surname include:

 Mari Törőcsik (1935–2021), Hungarian actress
 András Törőcsik (1955–2022), Hungarian football player

Hungarian-language surnames